Promised Land is the first solo studio album released by American blues guitarist Robert Walker after over fifty years of performing. The album was released in 1997 by Rooster Blues. It contains only one original song by Walker himself, with rest being treatments of standards from a wide range of styles.

Track listing 
"Goin' to the Train Station" (Cooke) — 6:01
"Please Love Me" (B. B. King) — 4:05
"Just a Country Boy" (Walker) — 7:04
"Promised Land" (Berry) — 3:43
"You Took My Love " (John) — 5:52
"Still a Fool" (Waters) — 3:47
"Wild Side of Life/It Wasn't God Who Made Honky Tonk Angels" (Carter, Miller, Warren) — 1:55
"Everything Gonna Be Alright" (Magic Sam) — 4:40
"Baby, Baby, Baby" (Cooke) — 2:12
"How Much More/Mama Talk to Your Daughter" (Lenoir) — 3:32
"Better Lovin' Man" (Axton) — 4:39
"Hold That Train, Conductor" (Clayton) — 3:55
"Got My Mojo Working" (Foster) — 4:16
"Berry Pickin'" (Berry) — 2:52

Personnel 
Performers:
Robert Walker — guitar, arranger, vocals, producer
Sam Carr — drums
Frank Frost - organ

Production:
Spencer Diablo — digital editing
Brent Endres — mixing
Duncan Hudson — engineer, mixing
Patty Johnson, Jim O'Neal — producer, mixing
Susan Bauer Lee, Selina O'Neal — cover design
Bill Steber — photography

Reception 
AllMusic says that this album has "no real weak cuts" with "a good number of true gems" but mentions that the audio recorded is subpar for the studio. The Penguin Guide to Blues Recordings, however, warms to the audio, equating it to "the sweaty vigour of a juke-join Saturday night." According to reviewer Chris Smith, between this and Rock the Night, Promised Land "has the edge, but only just."

References 

Robert Walker (musician) albums
1997 albums